Chloride City is a ghost town in Inyo County, California, United States. The former settlement is in Death Valley National Park.

The town was established in 1905 when the Bullfrog, Nevada, gold discovery brought people into the area. The ghost town contains numerous adits, dumps, and the grave of James McKay, of whom nothing is known. The town also holds the remains of three stamp mills.

See also
List of ghost towns in California

References

External links
 

Ghost towns in Inyo County, California
Mining communities in California
Populated places in the Mojave Desert
Death Valley
Amargosa Desert
Populated places established in 1905
1905 establishments in California